The Middlesex Senior Cup is the most prestigious football cup competition in the historic county of Middlesex, England. The competition is run mainly for non-League clubs in the region, although league clubs have been known to enter the competition, including Brentford, Barnet and Chelsea. In order to be eligible to play in the Middlesex Senior Cup, clubs have to play at step 5 or above of the National League System.

Finals

See also
Middlesex County Football Association
Middlesex Senior Charity Cup
George Ruffell Memorial Shield

Notes

References

County Cup competitions
Football competitions in London
Sport in Middlesex